Major County is a county in the northwestern part of the U.S. state of Oklahoma. As of the 2010 census, its population was 7,527. Its county seat is Fairview. The county was created in 1907.

Located in northwestern Oklahoma, Major County is bounded by Woods and Alfalfa counties in the north, Garfield County on the east, Kingfisher, Blaine, and Dewey on the south, and Woodward on the west. Major County has 957.87 square miles of land and water. It is drained by the North Canadian and Cimarron Rivers, and the Eagle Chief, Griever, and Sand Creeks.

History
Upon statehood in 1907, Major County was created from southern part of a territorial county. Fairview, which had been settled following the Land Run of 1893, was designated the county seat, and voters reaffirmed the choice on December 22, 1908. The county commissioners rented office space until a brick courthouse was constructed. A second courthouse, made of stone, was erected in 1928.

Named for John Charles Major, a representative to the state's 1906 Constitutional Convention, the area was originally settled by large numbers of Kansas Mennonites. One county town, Meno, received its name from an early leader of the Mennonite movement, Menno Simons.

The county experienced "Black Sunday" dust storms on April 14, 1935.

Geography

Eagle Chief Creek, which empties into the Cimarron River near Cleo Springs, was known to the Cheyenne people as Maheonekamax.

A large gypsum formation extends across much of western Oklahoma, and the Ames Structure, which is buried under 3,000 meters of sand and soil, is possibly the result of a meteorite impact.

The town of Ringwood is a well-known producer of watermelons in the region and holds a Watermelon Festival annually.

Major highways
  U.S. Highway 60
  U.S. Highway 281
  U.S. Highway 412
  State Highway 8
  State Highway 58

Adjacent counties
 Woods County (northwest)
 Alfalfa County (northeast)
 Garfield County (east)
 Kingfisher County (southeast)
 Blaine County (south)
 Dewey County (southwest)
 Woodward County (west)

Demographics

As of the 2000 Census,  7,545 people, 3,046 households, and 2,208 families resided in the county. The population density was 8 people per square mile (3/km2). The 3,540 housing units averaged 4 per square mile (1/km2). Nearly all of the county's residents (94.96%) were listed as White and 94.7% spoke English. Most of the remaining residents were listed as Hispanic or Latino (4.02%), who spoke Spanish (4.1%), Native American (0.9%), or mixed (1.44%). A few spoke German as their first language.

Of the 3,046 households in 2000, 31% had children under 18, 63.7% were married couples, 6% were a female householder with no husband present, and 27.5% were not families. A quarter of the households were made up of individuals, and 13.5% had someone living alone who was 65 or older. The average household size was 2.44, and the average family size was 2.92.

The median age was 42 years. The age distribution was  24.7% under 18, 6.7% were 18 to 24, 24.4% were 25 to 44, 24.9% were 45 to 64, and 19.4% were 65 or older. Females slightly outnumber males, with 95.4 males for every 100 females and 91.5 males for every 100 females 18 and over.

The median income for a household was $30,949, and for a family was $36,888. Males had a median income of $28,078 versus $17,658 for females. The per capita income for the county was $17,272. About 9.3 percent of families and 12 percent of the population were below the poverty line, including 15.1% of those under 18 and 9.3% of those 65 or over.

Politics

Major County has been won by the Republican presidential nominee in every election except the 1932 Roosevelt landslide, when Herbert Hoover lost every county in the West South Central States, being the only county in Oklahoma to be won by Alf Landon in 1936. In the last five elections the Republican presidential candidate has defeated the Democratic candidate by at least 60%, and no Democrat since Jimmy Carter in 1976 has obtained even 30% of the county's vote.

It is part of Oklahoma's 3rd congressional district, which has a Cook Partisan Voting Index of R+29 and is represented by Frank Lucas. In the Oklahoma Senate, it is part of the 27th district and is represented by Republican Casey Murdock. In the Oklahoma House of Representatives, it is part of the 58th district and is represented by Republican Carl Newton.

Economy
The county's economy has historically been based on agriculture, specifically wheat farming, poultry raising, and cattle ranching. Major crops have included corn, wheat, kaffir corn, broomcorn, and alfalfa. The Hallren Poultry and Creamery founded in Fairview in 1936 was the county's largest employer by the late 1950s.

Oil and gas production have significantly bolstered the county economy, especially around the Ames Structure and the Ringwood oil field.

Communities

City
 Fairview (county seat)

Towns
 Ames
 Cleo Springs
 Meno
 Ringwood

Census-designated places
 Chester
 Isabella

Other unincorporated places
 Orienta

NRHP sites

These sites in Major County are listed on the National Register of Historic Places:
 Major County Courthouse, Fairview
 First United Methodist Church, Fairview

References

 
1907 establishments in Oklahoma
Populated places established in 1907